"Jesus Christ Is Risen Today" is a Christian hymn. It was initially written in the 14th century as a Bohemian Latin hymn titled "".  It is an Easter hymn referring to the Resurrection of Jesus and based on Matthew 28:6, Acts 2:32, 1 Peter 3:18 and Revelation 1:17-18.

History 
"Jesus Christ Is Risen Today" was first written in Latin titled "", as a Bohemian hymn in the 14th century by an unknown author on manuscripts written in Munich and Breslau. In Latin, it had eleven verses. It was first translated into English in 1708 by John Baptist Walsh to be included in his  (Collection of Divine Songs and Hymns). The verses of the hymn were revised in 1749 by John Arnold. Initially the hymn only had three verses translated with just the first verse being a direct translation; in 1740 Charles Wesley (one of the founders of Methodism) added a fourth verse to the hymn as an alternative, which was later adopted into the hymn as part of it. The hymn is also noted for having Alleluia as a refrain after every line.

There was a later version of "Easter Hymn" composed by William Henry Monk which is also used for "Jesus Christ Is Risen Today". Some denominations of Christianity often just use one while some use both. The hymn is sometimes confused with "Christ the Lord Is Risen Today", which was written by Wesley. This is because the wording is similar and "Christ the Lord Is Risen Today" is usually likewise sung to "Easter Hymn" with Llanfair generally being the most common alternative .

References

External links 
 "Jesus Christ is Risen Today" sung by the Ely Cathedral Choir

English Christian hymns
Latin-language Christian hymns
Easter hymns
14th-century hymns
Songs about Jesus
Hymns in The English Hymnal